Dedeköy may refer to:

 Dedeköy, Çankırı
 Dedeköy, Dicle
 Dedeköy, Koçarlı, a village in Aydın Province, Turkey
 Dedeköy, Hamamözü, a village in Amasya Province, Turkey
 Dedeköy, Mudanya